The 1990 NCAA Division I Women's Tennis Championships were the ninth annual championships to determine the national champions of NCAA Division I women's singles, doubles, and team collegiate tennis in the United States.

For the fifth consecutive year, Stanford claimed the women's team national title, the Cardinal's seventh.

Host sites
The women's tournaments were held in Gainesville, Florida, hosted by the University of Florida. The men's and women's tournaments would not be held at the same site until 2006.

See also
1990 NCAA Division I Men's Tennis Championships
NCAA Division II Tennis Championships (Men, Women)
NCAA Division III Tennis Championships (Men, Women)

References

External links
List of NCAA Women's Tennis Champions

NCAA Division I tennis championships
NCAA Division I Women's Tennis Championships
NCAA Division I Women's Tennis Championships
NCAA Division I Women's Tennis Championships